The Oghuz Turks (Middle Turkic: ٱغُز,  Oγuz) were a western Turkic people who spoke the Oghuz branch of the Turkic language family. In the 8th century, they formed a tribal confederation conventionally named the Oghuz Yabgu State in Central Asia. The name Oghuz is a Common Turkic word for "tribe". Byzantine sources call the Oghuz the Uzes (Οὐ̑ζοι, Ouzoi). By the 10th century, Islamic sources were calling them Muslim Turkmens, as opposed to Tengrist or Buddhist. By the 12th century, this term had passed into Byzantine usage and the Oghuzes were overwhelmingly Muslim. The term "Oghuz" was gradually supplanted among the Turks themselves by the terms Turkmen and Turcoman, ( or Türkmân) from the mid-10th century on, a process which was completed by the beginning of the 13th century.

The Oghuz confederation migrated westward from the Jeti-su area after a conflict with the Karluk allies of the Uyghurs. Today, much of the populations of Turkey, Azerbaijan and Turkmenistan are descendants of Oghuz Turks and their language belongs to the Oghuz group of the Turkic languages family. Kara-Khanid scholar Mahmud al-Kashgari wrote that of all the Turkic languages, that of the Oghuz was the simplest. He also observed that the Oghuz had been separated for so long from the eastern Turks, that the language of the Turks in the east could be clearly distinguished from the language of the Oghuz and Kipchak further west.

In the 9th century, the Oghuz from the Aral steppes drove Bechens from the Emba and Ural River region toward the west. In the 10th century, they inhabited the steppe of the rivers Sari-su, Turgai and Emba to the north of Lake Balkhash of modern-day Kazakhstan. A clan of this nation, the Seljuks, embraced Islam and in the 11th century entered Persia, where they founded the Great Seljuk Empire.
Similarly in the 11th century, a Tengriist Oghuz clan, referred to as Uzes or Torks in the chronicles of Rurikid Kievan Rus', overthrew Pecheneg supremacy in the steppes of Rus' Khaganate. Harried by another Turkic people, the Kipchaks, these Oghuz penetrated as far as the lower Danube, crossed it and invaded the Balkans, where they were struck down by an outbreak of plague, causing the survivors either to flee or to join the Byzantine imperial forces as mercenaries (1065).

The Oghuz seem to have been related to the Pechenegs, some of whom were clean-shaven and others of whom had small 'goatee' beards. According to the book on the leader of the Huns, Attila and the Nomad Hordes, "Like the Kimaks they set up many carved wooden funerary statues surrounded by simple stone balbal monoliths." The authors of the book go on to note that "Those Uzes or Torks who settled along the Russian frontier were gradually Slavicized, though they also played a leading role as cavalry in 1100- and early 1200-era Russian armies, where they were known as Black Hats... Oghuz warriors served in almost all Islamic armies of the Middle East from the 1000s onwards, in Byzantium from the 800s, and even in Spain and Morocco." In later centuries, they adapted and applied their own traditions and institutions to the ends of the Islamic world and emerged as empire-builders with a constructive sense of statecraft.

Linguistically, the Oghuz belong to the Common Turkic speaking group, characterized by sound correspondences such as Common Turkic /-š/ versus Oghuric /-l/ and Common Turkic /-z/ versus Oghuric /-r/.Within the Common Turkic group, the Oghuz languages share these innovations: loss of Proto-Turkic gutturals in suffix anlaut, loss of /ɣ/ except after /a/, /g/ becoming either /j/ or lost, voicing of /t/ to /d/ and of /k/ to /g/, and */ð/ becomes /j/.

Apart from the Seljuks, dynasties of Khwarazmians, Qara Qoyunlu, Aq Qoyunlu,
Ottomans and Afsharids are also believed to descend from the Oghuz-Turkmen tribes of Begdili, Yiva, Bayandur, Kayi and Afshar respectively.

The Ottoman dynasty, who gradually took over Anatolia after the fall of the Seljuks, toward the end of the 13th century, led an army that was also predominantly Oghuz. The Ottomans proved to be superior to other local Oghuz Turkish states. Ahmed Bican Yazıcıoğlu, in early 15th century, traced Osman's genealogy to Oghuz Khagan, the legendary ancient ancestor of Turkic people, through his eldest grandson of his eldest son, so giving the Ottoman sultans primacy among Turkish monarchs.

Origins

Turkologist Peter Benjamin Golden (2011) used Proto-Turkic lexical items about the climate, topography, flora, fauna, people's modes of subsistence in the Proto-Turkic Urheimat to locate it in the southern, taiga-steppe zone of the Sayan-Altay region. Recently, the early Turkic peoples are proposed to descend from agricultural communities in Northeast Asia who moved westwards into Mongolia in the late 3rd millennium BC, where they adopted a pastoral lifestyle. By the early 1st millennium BC, these peoples had become equestrian nomads. In subsequent centuries, the steppe populations of Central Asia appear to have been progressively replaced and Turkified by East Asian nomadic Turks, moving out of Mongolia.

During the 2nd century BC, according to ancient Chinese sources, a steppe tribal confederation known as the Xiongnu and their allies, the Wusun (probably an Indo-European people) defeated the neighboring Indo-European-speaking Yuezhi and drove them out of western China and into Central Asia. Various scholarly theories link the Xiongnu to Turkic peoples and/or the Huns. Bichurin claimed that the first usage of the word Oghuz appears to have been the title of Oğuz Kağan, whose biography shares similarities with the biography, recorded by Han Chinese, of Xiongnu leader Modu Shanyu (or Mau-Tun), who founded the Xiongnu Empire. However, Oghuz Khan narratives were actually collected in Compendium of Chronicles by Ilkhanid scholar Rashid-al-Din in the early 14th century.

Sima Qian recorded the name Wūjiē 烏揭 (LHC: *ʔɔ-gɨat) or Hūjiē 呼揭 (LHC: *xɔ-gɨat), of a people hostile to the Xiongnu and living immediately west of them, in the area of the Irtysh River, near Lake Zaysan. Golden suggests that these might be Chinese renditions of *Ogur ~ *Oguz, yet uncertainty remains. According to one theory, Hūjiē is just another transliteration of Yuezhi and may refer to the Turkic Uyghurs; however, this is controversial and has few scholarly adherents.

Yury Zuev (1960) links the Oghuz to the Western Turkic tribe 姑蘇 Gūsū < (MC *kuo-suo) in the 8th-century encyclopaedia Tongdian (or erroneously Shǐsū 始蘇 in the 11th century Zizhi Tongjian). Zuev also noted a parallel between two passages: 
one from the 8th-century Taibo Yinjing (太白陰經) "Venus's Secret Classic" by Li Quan (李筌) which mentioned the 三窟 ~ 三屈 "Three Qu" (< MC *k(h)ɨut̚) after the 十箭 Shí Jiàn "Ten Arrows" (OTrk 𐰆𐰣:𐰸 On Oq) and Jĭu Xìng "Nine Surnames" (OTrk 𐱃𐰸𐰆𐰔:𐰆𐰍𐰔 Toquz Oğuz); and 
another from al-Maṣudi's Meadows of Gold and Mines of Gems, which mentioned the three hordes of the Turkic Ġuz 
Based on those sources, Zuev proposes that in the 8th century the Oghuzes were located outsides of the Ten Arrows' jurisdiction, west of the Altai mountains, near lake Issyk-Kul, Talas river's basin and seemingly around the Syr Darya basin, and near the Chumul, Karluks, Qays, Quns, Śari, etc. who were mentioned by al-Maṣudi and Sharaf al-Zaman al-Marwazi.

According to Ahmad ibn Fadlan, the Oghuz were nomads, but also had cultivated crops, and the economy was based on a semi-pastoralist lifestyle.

Byzantine emperor Constantine VII Porphyrogennetos mentioned the Uzi and Mazari (Hungarians) as neighbours of the Pechenegs.

By the time of the Orkhon inscriptions (8th century AD) "Oghuz" was being applied generically to all inhabitants of the Göktürk Khaganate. Within the khaganate, the Oghuz community gradually expanded, incorporating other tribes. A number of subsequent tribal confederations bore the name Oghuz, often affixed to a numeral indicating the number of united tribes. These include references to the simple Oguz, Üch-Oghuz ("three Oghuz"), Altï Oghuz ("six Oghuz"), possibly the Otuz Oghuz ("thirty Oghuz"), Sekiz-Oghuz ("eight Oghuz"), and the Tokuz-Oghuz ("nine Oghuz"), who originally occupied different areas in the vicinity of the Altai Mountains. Golden (2011) states Transoxanian Oghuz Turks who founded the Oghuz Yabgu State were not the same tribal confederation as the Toquz Oghuz from whom emerged the founders of Uyghur Khaganate. Istakhri and Muhammad ibn Muhmad al-Tusi kept the Toquz Oghuz and Oghuz distinct and Ibn al-Faqih mentioned: "the infidel Turk-Oghuz, the Toquz-Oghuz, and the Qarluq" Even so, Golden notes the confusion in Latter Göktürks' and Uyghurs' inscriptions, where Oghuz apparently referred to Toquz Oghuz or another tribal grouping, who were also named Oghuz without a prefixed numeral; this confusion is also reflected in Sharaf al-Zaman al-Marwazi, who listed 12 Oghuz tribes, who were ruled by a "Toquz Khaqan" and some of whom were Toquz-Oghuz, on the border of Transoxiana and Khwarazm. At most, the Oghuz were possibly led by a core group of Toquz Oghuz clans or tribes.

Noting that the mid-8th-century Tariat inscriptions, in Uyghur khagan Bayanchur's honor, mentioned the rebellious Igdir tribe who had revolted against him, Klyashtorny considers this as one piece of "direct evidence in favour of the existence of kindred relations between the Tokuz Oguzs of Mongolia, The Guzs of the Aral region, and modern Turkmens", besides the facts that Kashgari mentioned the Igdir as the 14th of 22 Oghuz tribes; and that Igdirs constitute part of the Turkmen tribe Chowdur. The Shine Usu inscription, also in Bayanchur's honor, mentioned the Nine-Oghuzes as "[his] people" and that he defeated the Eight-Oghuzes and their allies, the Nine Tatars, three times in 749.; according to Klyashtorny and Czeglédy, eight tribes of the Nine-Oghuzes revolted against the leading Uyghur tribe and renamed themselves Eight-Oghuzes.

Ibn al-Athir, an Arab historian, claimed that the Oghuz Turks were settled mainly in Transoxiana, between the Caspian and Aral Seas, during the period of the caliph Al-Mahdi (after 775 AD). By 780, the eastern parts of the Syr Darya were ruled by the Karluk Turks and to their west were the Oghuz. Transoxiana, their main homeland in subsequent centuries became known as the "Oghuz Steppe".

During the period of the Abbasid caliph Al-Ma'mun (813–833), the name Oghuz starts to appear in the works of Islamic writers. The Book of Dede Korkut, a historical epic of the Oghuz, contains historical echoes of the 9th and 10th centuries but was likely written several centuries later.

Physical appearance

Al-Masudi described Yangikent's Oghuz Turks as "distinguished from other Turks by their valour, their slanted eyes, and the smallness of their stature". Stone heads of Seljuq elites kept at the New York Metropolitan Museum of Art displayed East Asian features. Over time, Oghuz Turks' physical appearance changed. Rashid al-Din Hamadani stated that "because of the climate their features gradually changed into those of Tajiks. Since they were not Tajiks, the Tajik peoples called them turkmān, i.e. Turk-like (Turk-mānand)" Ḥāfiẓ Tanīsh Mīr Muḥammad Bukhārī also related that the Oghuz' ‘Turkic face did not remain as it was’ after their migration into Transoxiana and Iran. Khiva khan Abu al-Ghazi Bahadur wrote in his Chagatai-language treatise Genealogy of the Turkmens that "their chin started to become narrow, their eyes started to become large, their faces started to become small, and their noses started to become big’ after five or six generations". Ottoman historian Mustafa Âlî commented in Künhüʾl-aḫbār that Anatolian Turks and Ottoman elites are ethnically mixed: "Most of the inhabitants of Rûm are of confused ethnic origin. Among its notables there are few whose lineage does not go back to a convert to Islam."

Social units

The militarism that the Oghuz empires were very well known for was rooted in their centuries-long nomadic lifestyle. In general, they were a herding society which possessed certain military advantages that sedentary societies did not have, particularly mobility. Alliances by marriage and kinship, and systems of "social distance" based on family relationships were the connective tissues of their society.

In Oghuz traditions, "society was simply the result of the growth of individual families". But such a society also grew by alliances and the expansion of different groups, normally through marriages. The shelter of the Oghuz tribes was a tent-like dwelling, erected on wooden poles and covered with skin, felt, or hand-woven textiles, which is called a yurt.

Their cuisine included yahni (stew), kebabs, Toyga soup (meaning "wedding soup"), Kımız (a traditional drink of the Turks, made from fermented horse milk), Pekmez (a syrup made of boiled grape juice) and helva made with wheat starch or rice flour, tutmac (noodle soup), yufka (flattened bread), katmer (layered pastry), chorek (ring-shaped buns), bread, clotted cream, cheese, yogurt, milk and ayran (diluted yogurt beverage), as well as wine.

Social order was maintained by emphasizing "correctness in conduct as well as ritual and ceremony". Ceremonies brought together the scattered members of the society to celebrate birth, puberty, marriage, and death. Such ceremonies had the effect of minimizing social dangers and also of adjusting persons to each other under controlled emotional conditions.

Patrilineally related men and their families were regarded as a group with rights over a particular territory and were distinguished from neighbours on a territorial basis. Marriages were often arranged among territorial groups so that neighbouring groups could become related, but this was the only organizing principle that extended territorial unity. Each community of the Oghuz Turks was thought of as part of a larger society composed of distant as well as close relatives. This signified "tribal allegiance". Wealth and materialistic objects were not commonly emphasized in Oghuz society and most remained herders, and when settled they would be active in agriculture.

Status within the family was based on age, gender, relationships by blood, or marriageability. Males, as well as females, were active in society, yet men were the backbones of leadership and organization. According to the Book of Dede Korkut, which demonstrates the culture of the Oghuz Turks, women were "expert horse riders, archers, and athletes". The elders were respected as repositories of both "secular and spiritual wisdom".

Homeland in Transoxiana

In the 700s, the Oghuz Turks made a new home and domain for themselves in the area between the Caspian and Aral seas, a region that is often referred to as Transoxiana, the western portion of Turkestan. They had moved westward from the Altay mountains passing through the Siberian steppes and settled in this region, and also penetrated into southern Russia and the Volga from their bases in west China. In the 11th century, the Oghuz Turks adopted Arabic script, replacing the Old Turkic alphabet.

In his accredited 11th-century treatise titled Diwan Lughat al-Turk, Karakhanid scholar Mahmud of Kashgar mentioned five Oghuz cities named Sabran, Sitkün, Qarnaq, Suğnaq, and Qaraçuq (the last of which was also known to Kashgari as Farab, now Otrar; situated near the Karachuk mountains to its east). The extension from the Karachuk Mountains towards the Caspian Sea (Transoxiana) was called the "Oghuz Steppe Lands" from where the Oghuz Turks established trading, religious and cultural contacts with the Abbasid Arab caliphate who ruled to the south. This is around the same time that they first converted to Islam and renounced their Tengriism belief system. The Arab historians mentioned that the Oghuz Turks in their domain in Transoxiana were ruled by a number of kings and chieftains.

It was in this area that they later founded the Seljuk Empire, and it was from this area that they spread west into western Asia and eastern Europe during Turkic migrations from the 9th until the 12th century. The founders of the Ottoman Empire were also Oghuz Turks.

Poetry and literature

Oghuz Turkish literature includes the famous Book of Dede Korkut which was UNESCO's 2000 literary work of the year, as well as the Oghuzname, Battalname, Danishmendname, Köroğlu epics which are part of the literary history of Azerbaijanis, Turks of Turkey and Turkmens. The modern and classical literature of Azerbaijan, Turkey and Turkmenistan are also considered Oghuz literature since it was produced by their descendants.

The Book of Dede Korkut is a valuable collection of epics and stories, bearing witness to the language, the way of life, religions, traditions, and social norms of the Oghuz Turks in Azerbaijan, Turkey, Iran (West Azerbaijan, Golestan) and parts of Central Asia including Turkmenistan.

Oghuz and Yörüks 

Yörüks are an Oghuz ethnic group, some of whom are still semi-nomadic, primarily inhabiting the mountains of Anatolia and partly Balkan peninsula. Their name derives from the verb from Chagatai language, yörü- "yörümek" (to walk), but Western Turkic yürü- (yürümek in infinitive), which means "to walk", with the word Yörük or Yürük designating "those who walk, walkers".

The Yörük to this day appear as a distinct segment of the population of Macedonia and Thrace where they settled as early as the 14th century. While today the Yörük are increasingly settled, many of them still maintain their nomadic lifestyle, breeding goats and sheep in the Taurus Mountains and further eastern parts of mediterranean regions (in southern Anatolia), in the Pindus (Epirus, Greece), the Šar Mountains (North Macedonia), the Pirin and Rhodope Mountains (Bulgaria) and Dobrudja. An earlier offshoot of the Yörüks, the Kailars or Kayılar Turks were amongst the first Turkish colonists in Europe, (Kailar or Kayılar being the Turkish name for the Greek town of Ptolemaida which took its current name in 1928) formerly inhabiting parts of the Greek regions of Thessaly and Macedonia. Settled Yörüks could be found until 1923, especially near and in the town of Kozani.

List of Oghuz dynasties

Oghuz Yabgu State
Pechenegs
Seljuks
Zengid dynasty
Anatolian beyliks
Khwarazmian dynasty
Ottomans
Aq Qoyunlu
Kara Koyunlu
Safavid
Afsharids
Qajars
Azerbaijani khanates

Traditional tribal organization

Mahmud al-Kashgari listed 22 Oghuz tribes in Dīwān Lughāt al-Turk. Kashgari further wrote that "In origin they are 24 tribes, but the two Khalajiyya tribes are distinguished from them [the twenty-two] in certain respects and so are not counted among them. This is the origin".

Later, Charuklug from Kashgari's list would be omitted. Rashid-al-Din and Abu al-Ghazi Bahadur added three more: Kïzïk, Karkïn, and Yaparlï, to the list in Jami' al-tawarikh (Compendium of Chronicles) and Shajare-i Türk (Genealogy of the Turks), respectively. According to Selçukname, Oghuz Khagan had 6 children (Sun – Gün, Moon – Ay, Star – Yıldız, Sky – Gök, Mountain – Dağ, Sea – Diŋiz), and all six would become Khans themselves, each leading four tribes.

Bozoks (Gray Arrows)

Gün Han
Kayı (Ottomans, Jandarids and Chobanids)
Bayat (Qajars, Dulkadirids, Fuzûlî)
Alkaevli
Karaevli
Ay Han
Yazır (disambiguation)
Döger (Artuqids)
Dodurga
Yaparlı
Yıldız Han
Afshar (Afsharids and Zengids)
Qiziq
Begdili (Khwarazmian dynasty)
Kargın

Üçoks (Three Arrows)

Gök Han
Bayandur (founders of the Ak Koyunlu)
Pecheneg
Çavuldur (Tzachas)
Chepni (refer to Küresünni)
Dağ Han
Salur (Kadi Burhan al-Din, Salghurids and Karamanids; see also: Salars)
Eymür
Alayuntlu
Yüreğir (Ramadanids)
Diŋiz Han
Iğdır
Büğdüz
Yıva (Qara Qoyunlu and Oghuz Yabgu State)
Kınık (founders of the Seljuk Empire)

List of Oghuz ethnic groups
Azerbaijani people
Qashqai people
Gagauz people
Turkish people
Turkmen people
Salar people

Other Oghuz sub-ethnic groups and tribes

Anatolia and Caucasus
Anatolia
Abdal of Turkey
Yörüks
Tahtacı
Varsak
Barak
Karakeçili (Black Goat Turkomans)
Manav
Atçeken
Küresünni
Chepni
Caucasus
Azerbaijanis in Armenia
Azerbaijanis in Turkey
Azerbaijanis in Georgia
Terekeme people
Qarapapaq
Karadaghis
Javanshir clan
Trukhmen
Turks in Abkhazia
Cyprus
Cypriot Turks

Balkans

Turks in Bosnia
Bulgarian Turks
Turks in Croatia
Dodecanese Turks
Kosovan Turks
Macedonian Turks
Turks in Serbia
Turks in Montenegro
Romanian Turks
Turks of Western Thrace
Cretan Turks
Karamanlides
Gajal
Amuca tribe

Central Asia
Meskhetian Turks

Iran and Greater Khorasan

Iranian Azerbaijanis
Shahsevan
Qizilbash
Padar tribe
Khorasani Turks
Iranian Turkmens
Afghan Turkmens
Qajars (tribe)
Bichaghchi
Turks in Afghanistan

Arab world

Turks in Libya
Turks in Egypt
Turks in Algeria
Syrian Turkmen
Iraqi Turkmen
Turks in Lebanon
Turks in Israel
Turks in Jordan
Turks in Tunisia
Turks in Saudi Arabia
Turks in Yemen

See also
Algoz
Turkic migration
List of Turkic dynasties and countries
History of Turkic peoples
Timeline of Turks (500-1300)
Turkomans

Notes

References

Sources
 
 
 
 
 
 
 
    Text was copied from this source, which is available under a  Creative Commons Attribution 4.0 International License.

Further reading
 Grousset, R., The Empire of the Steppes, 1991, Rutgers University Press
 Nicole, D., Attila and the Huns, 1990, Osprey Publishing
 Lewis, G., The Book of Dede Korkut, "Introduction", 1974, Penguin Books
 Minahan, James B. One Europe, Many Nations: A Historical Dictionary of European National Groups. Greenwood Press, 2000. page 692
 Aydın, Mehmet. Bayat-Bayat boyu ve Oğuzların tarihi. Hatiboğlu Yayınevi, 1984. web page

External links

 
 
The Book of Dede Korkut (pdf format) at the Uysal-Walker Archive of Turkish Oral Narrative
Similarities between the epics of Dede Korkut and Alpamysh
A page dedicated to Oguz Khan
The Old Turkic Inscriptions.

 
History of the Turkish people
Turkic peoples of Asia
Turkic peoples of Europe